The 1994–95 season of the UEFA Cup Winners' Cup was won by Real Zaragoza in the final against defending champions Arsenal, the Spanish club winning thanks to a last-minute goal from midfielder Nayim with a shot from 40 yards. Moldova joined the competition for the first time. It was the first season under a new name as the tournament used to be known as the European Cup Winners' Cup.

Qualifying round

|}

First leg

Second leg

Pirin Blagoevgrad won 4–0 on aggregate.

HJK won 7–0 on aggregate.

Tatran Prešov won 5–0 on aggregate.

Žalgiris Vilnius won 7–0 on aggregate.

Bodø/Glimt won 6–0 on aggregate.

4–4 on aggregate; KF Tirana won on away goals.

Ferencváros won 12–2 on aggregate.

Sligo Rovers won 3–2 on aggregate.

Maccabi Tel Aviv won 6–2 on aggregate.

Maribor won 14–1 on aggregate.

AC Omonia won 4–1 on aggregate.

Viktoria Žižkov won 4–3 on aggregate.

First round
For the 1994–95 season, England had two representatives in the tournament, neither of which was the domestic cup winners. The first was Arsenal, who were the Cup Winners' Cup holders, and the second was Chelsea, who had lost the 1994 FA Cup final to double winners Manchester United. Both teams were eliminated from competition by eventual winners Real Zaragoza of Spain.

|}

First leg

Second leg

Feyenoord won 3–2 on aggregate.

Werder Bremen won 2–0 on aggregate.

Tatran Prešov won 5–4 on aggregate.

Real Zaragoza won 5–2 on aggregate.

Club Brugge won 5–2 on aggregate.

Panathinaikos won 8–1 on aggregate.

Chelsea won 4–2 on aggregate.

Austria Wien won 4–1 on aggregate.

Brøndby won 4–0 on aggregate.

Arsenal won 6–1 on aggregate.

Beşiktaş won 3–1 on aggregate.

Auxerre won 4–3 on aggregate.

Sampdoria won 4–3 on aggregate.

Grasshopper won 3–1 on aggregate.

Porto won 3–0 on aggregate.

3–3 on aggregate; Ferencváros won 7–6 on penalties.

Second round

|}

First leg

Second leg

Real Zaragoza won 6–1 on aggregate.

Feyenoord won 5–3 on aggregate.

Club Brugge won 1–0 on aggregate.

1–1 on aggregate; Chelsea won on away goals.

Arsenal won 4–3 on aggregate.

Auxerre won 4–2 on aggregate.

Sampdoria won 5–3 on aggregate.

Porto won 6–2 on aggregate.

Quarter-finals

|}

First leg

Second leg

Chelsea won 2–1 on aggregate.

Real Zaragoza won 2–1 on aggregate.

Arsenal won 2–1 on aggregate.

1–1 on aggregate; Sampdoria won 5–3 on penalties.

Semi-finals

|}

First leg

Second leg

Real Zaragoza won 4–3 on aggregate.

5–5 on aggregate; Arsenal won 3–2 on penalties.

Final

Top goalscorers

See also
1994–95 UEFA Champions League
1994–95 UEFA Cup

References

External links
 1994–95 competition at UEFA website
 UEFA Cup Winners' Cup results at Rec.Sport.Soccer Statistics Foundation
 Cup Winners Cup Seasons 1994-95 – results, protocols
 Archive of old UEFA pages sites Season 1994–95, written protocol games. On the opened page, click on the word "Impatient"

3
UEFA Cup Winners' Cup seasons